Boidobra is a civil parish in the municipality of Covilhã, Portugal.

References

Freguesias of Covilhã